Like all municipalities of Puerto Rico, Yabucoa is subdivided into administrative units called barrios, which are roughly comparable to minor civil divisions, (and means wards or boroughs or neighborhoods in English). The barrios and subbarrios, in turn, are further subdivided into smaller local populated place areas/units called sectores (sectors in English). The types of sectores may vary, from normally sector to urbanización to reparto to barriada to residencial, among others. Some sectors appear in two barrios.

List of sectors by barrio

Aguacate
	Camino Antonio Rodríguez
	Camino El Cabrito 
	Camino Luis Ortiz 
	Extensión Villas de Buenaventura 
	Parcelas Comunas Nuevas 
	Parcelas Comunas Viejas 
	Sector Aguacate Adentro 
	Sector Aguacate Arriba 
	Sector Calle El Sol 
	Sector El Cerro 
	Sector Ingenio 
	Sector Jagueyes 
	Sector La Curva 
	Sector Los Alicea 
	Sector Mariana II 
	Sector Parrilla 
	Sector Raja Boca 
	Urbanización Alturas de Terralinda 
	Urbanización Villas de Buenaventura

Calabazas
	Carretera 900 
	Parcelas Nuevas 
	Sector Calabazas Arriba 
	Sector Guayabo 
	Sector Playita Arriba 
	Sector Playita 
	Sector Rincón
	Sector Sodoma o Calabazas Adentro 
	Sector Vieques 
	Sector Villa Kilí 
	Sector y Parcelas Rosa Sánchez 
	Urbanización Jaime C. Rodríguez 
	Urbanización Santa María 
	Urbanización Valles de las Calabazas

Camino Nuevo

	Carretera 901
	Parcelas Camino Nuevo 
	Sector El Cocal 
	Sector El Guano 
	Sector El Negro 
	Sector El Nuevo Cuño 
	Sector Loma del Viento 
	Sector Los Colones 
	Sector Maloja 
	Sector Riefkohl 
	Sector Rincón 
	Sector Tamarindo

Guayabota
	Camino Doña Zaza 
	Sector El Cruce 
	Sector El Veinte 
	Sector La Aldea 
	Sector La Coa 
	Sector La Herradura 
	Sector Las Panas 
	Sector Los Sánchez 
	Sector Quebrada Grande
	Sector Quebradillas 
	Sector Surillo 
	Sector Tres Puntos

Jácanas
	Sector Campo Alegre 
	Sector Jácanas Abajo 
	Sector Jácanas Arriba 
	Sector Jácanas Granja 
	Sector Jácanas Sur 
	Sector Piedras Blancas

Juan Martín
	Apartamentos Ernesto Carrasquillo 
	Barriada Poblado Varsovia 
	Residencial Dr. Víctor Berríos 
	Reparto Horizonte 
	Sector Central Roig 
	Sector Cerro Santa Elena 
	Sector La Pica 
	Sector La Villa 
	Sector Las Panas 
	Sector Los Casanova 
	Sector Pandura 
	Urbanización Méndez 
	Urbanización Santa Elena 
	Urbanización Solimar 
	Urbanización Valles de Yabucoa 
	Urbanización Villa Hilda

Limones
	Parcelas Martorell 
	Sector Borinquen
	Sector La Casa 
	Sector La Laura 
	Sector Martorell Arriba 
	Sector Vieques

Playa

	Sector Calambreñas 
	Sector El Hoyo
	Sector Gandular 
	Sector Las Lomas 
	Sector Los Pavos 
	Sector Los Pinos 
	Sector Paraíso I 
	Sector Paraíso II 
	Sector Parrilla 
	Sector Playa Guayanés 
	Sector Veteranos 
	Sector Windy Hills 
	Urbanización Vista Mar

Tejas
	Carretera 639 
	Sector Los Tres Puntos 
	Sector Piedra Azul 
	Sector Tejas Afuera y Adentro 
	Sector Valerio Velázquez

Yabucoa barrio-pueblo
	Sector El Tosquero 
	Sector Poblado Calvario 
	Urbanización Francisco Sustache 
	Urbanización Jardines de Yabucoa 
	Urbanización Los Angeles 
	Urbanización Nueva 
	Urbanización Ramos Antonini 
	Urbanización Villa Recreo 
	Urbanización Yabucoa Real

See also

 List of communities in Puerto Rico

References

Yabucoa
Yabucoa